This is a list of airports in Lebanon, grouped by type and sorted by location.

Lebanon, officially the Republic of Lebanon, is a country in Western Asia, on the eastern shore of the Mediterranean Sea. It is bordered by Syria to the north and east, the Golan Heights to the southeast, and Israel to the south. Its capital and largest city is Beirut.



Airports 

Airport names shown in bold indicate the airport has scheduled service on commercial airlines.

See also 

 Transport in Lebanon
 List of airports by ICAO code: O#OL - Lebanon
 Wikipedia:WikiProject Aviation/Airline destination lists: Asia#Lebanon

References 
 
  - includes IATA codes
 Great Circle Mapper: Airports in Lebanon - IATA and ICAO codes
 World Aero Data: Airports in Lebanon - ICAO codes
Baadaran Airport
Baalbek Airfield
Marjayoun Airfield
Tel Al Zaatar Airport

Lebanon
 
Airports
Airports
Lebanon